Graveyard shift is a work shift running through the late hours of the night through the early hours of the morning, typically from midnight until 8 am.

Graveyard Shift may also refer to:

Media 
Graveyard Shift (1987 film), by Jerry Ciccoritti
Graveyard Shift (1990 film), based on the Stephen King story of the same name
Graveyard Shift (2005 film), a 2005 Russian comedy film
Graveyard Shift (SpongeBob SquarePants), TV series episode
Graveyard Shift (radio show), a late night radio show
Graveyard Shift, a mission in the video game Hitman 2: Silent Assassin
Graveyard Shift, a mission in Manhunt (video game) 
Graveyard slot, a time period in which a television audience is very small compared to other times of the day
Graveyard Shift, a name of street league in the video game Need for Speed Payback

Literature 
Graveyard Shift (short story), by Stephen King
Graveyard Shift, a 1960 short story by Richard Matheson
The Graveyard Shift (novel), by Harry Patterson
The Graveyard Shift, a short novel by William P. McGivern featured in Alfred Hitchcock's Anthology – Volume 4

Music 
“Graveyard Shift”, a song by Stela Cole from the 2020 extended play Woman of the Hour
"Graveyard Shift", a song by Nosferatu from the 1999 album ReVamped
"Graveyard Shift", a song by Uncle Tupelo from the 1990 album No Depression
"Graveyard Shift", a song by Sam Roberts from the album Collider
"Graveyard Shift", a song by Steve Earle from the album The Mountain
"Graveyard Shift", a song by Kardinal Offishall from the 2008 album Not 4 Sale
"Graveyard Shift", a song by John Zorn from the 1989 album Naked City
"Graveyard Shift", a song by Afroman from the 2000 album Because I Got High
"Graveyard Shift", a piece by NomeansNo from the 2010 album One
Graveyard Shift, a side-project of Jani Liimatainen and former bandmate Henrik Klingenberg
Graveyard Shift (album), an album by Motionless in White
The Graveyard Shift (album), a mixtape by 40 Glocc and Spider Loc